Kirk is an American family sitcom that aired on The WB from August 23, 1995, to January 12, 1997. The series was created by Ross Brown, and produced by Bickley-Warren Productions in association with Warner Bros. Television. Kirk was the follow-up starring vehicle for Kirk Cameron after his seven-year role as Mike Seaver on the popular ABC sitcom Growing Pains.

Synopsis
The show revolves around Kirk Hartman (Cameron), an aspiring illustrator and recent college graduate living in Greenwich Village. After his aunt decides to move to Florida to get married, Kirk is left in charge of his younger brothers and sister. It also stars Chelsea Noble, Will Estes, Courtland Mead, Louis Vanaria, and Debra Mooney.

Cast
Kirk Cameron as Kirk Hartman
Chelsea Noble as Elizabeth Waters
Louis Vanaria as Eddie Balducci
Will Estes as Cory Hartman
Taylor Fry as Phoebe Hartman
Courtland Mead as Russell Hartman
Debra Mooney as Sally

Production
Kirk was one of only two series produced by Bickley-Warren Productions and Jeff Franklin Productions that was not produced by Miller-Boyett Productions (the other being Hangin' with Mr. Cooper, which William Bickley and Michael Warren served as showrunners/executive producers during that series' final three seasons).

During the development stage, the series originally went under the working title Life Happens, and was originally conceived as a series for ABC (who had broadcast other series produced by Bickley and Warren, and their production partners Thomas L. Miller and Robert L. Boyett) before the network's decision to move away from family sitcoms, just prior to the network's 1995 purchase by The Walt Disney Company.

Episodes

Season 1 (1995–96)

Season 2 (1996–97)

Awards and nominations

References

External links
 

1995 American television series debuts
1997 American television series endings
1990s American sitcoms
English-language television shows
Television series by Warner Bros. Television Studios
Television shows set in Manhattan
The WB original programming